Malin Maria Birgitta Strömberg (born 13 April 1976 in Staffanstorp, Skåne County) is a former Swedish Olympic swimmer. She competed in the 1992 Summer Olympics, where she finished 24th in the 100 m butterfly.

Clubs
Ystads SS

References
 

1976 births
Swedish female butterfly swimmers
Living people
Swimmers at the 1992 Summer Olympics
Olympic swimmers of Sweden
Sportspeople from Skåne County
20th-century Swedish women